This is a list of episodes of the Canadian children's television series Theodore Tugboat. There are 130 episodes in the series (75 known to have aired). They premiered in Canada on CBC and the US on PBS in 65 pairs. Note:  Episodes may not appear in perfect chronological order.

Series overview

Season 1 (1993)

Season 2 (1994)

Season 3 (1995–1996)

Season 4 (1997–1999)

Season 5 (1999–2001)

See also
 Theodore Too

References

Lists of Canadian children's television series episodes